Johan Forsman or Johan Forsman Löwenström  (born 15 June 1968) is a Swedish musician, singer, record producer, songwriter, music arranger and engineer based in Gothenburg, Sweden. He was a member krautrock band Hübrizine in the late eighties and psychedelic rock band The Bad Karma and The Simpkins in the early nineties. Forsman has worked with musical acts such as the Soundtrack of our lives, Caesars, Weeping Willows, Håkan Hellström, Karin Dreijers early band Honey is Cool, Jens Lekman, Thåström, among others. Johan Forsman is still active as a record producer/engineer and is currently a member of Tapefly.

Early career
Forsman began recording artists in the late eighties using simple formulas of recording. Only equipment fabricated prior to 1980 were permitted in the studio. This resulted in a non-typical sound for the late eighties era. Among the first bands that had their early recordings engineered by Forsman were Broder Daniel and psychedelic rock group Whipped cream and other delights. Karin Dreijers Honey is Cool and Silverbullit. Eventually Forsman caught the attention of Union Carbide Productions front men Ebbot Lundberg, Björn Olsson and Ian Person as they were looking for someone to record their new band, the Soundtrack of our lives. Between 1994 and 1996 the pre-productions for TSOOL's first 2 double albums were recorded. Some of this material can be found under the name the Romelanda sessions.

Record production

In the summer of 1998 Forsman produced Björn Olsson Instrumental Music...to Submerge in...and Disappear Through together with Björn.
In the spring of 1999 Forsman worked with Håkan Hellström on the year 2000 Swedish platinum selling and multi Grammy awarded Känn ingen sorg för mig Göteborg.
This year Johan also worked as engineer on Swedish multi platinum selling Det är ni som är konstiga, det är jag som är normal by Thåström.
1999 Johan Forsman also produced and mixed Cherry Kicks by Caesars together with the band, finishing the album in 8 days.
Later the same year Forsman, together with TSOOL recorded and produced the U.S. Grammy nominated and gold-selling album Behind the music by the Soundtrack of our lives.
In 2001 Johan, together with Christina Löwenström wrote the song "Canine Prey" which would later become the 2008 Swedish smash hit "För en lång lång tid", when it was re-written and re-produced into Swedish by Håkan Hellström.
In 2001 Johan produced and engineered platinum selling Into the Light by Weeping Willows. Later the same year Forsman engineered Love for the Streets by Caesars, from where the iPod launch song "Jerk it out" was picked by Apple.
In 2002 Forsman, together with Håkan Hellström and Timo Räisänen produced and engineered Swedish platinum selling and multi Grammy awarded Det är så jag säger det by Håkan Hellström.
Later this year Johan mixed the Swedish gold selling album Mannen som blev en gris by Thåström.
In 2003 Forsman worked as producer and engineer with The Soundtrack of our lives on Swedish multi grammy nominated and gold selling album Origin.
In 2004 Forsman mixed Smugglers by Norwegian rock band WE.
In 2004 Johan also helped Silverbullit with engineering and recording on the album Arclight.
In 2005 Johan was hired as musician co producer and engineer and mixer on gold selling Nåt lånat, nåt blått, nåt gammalt, nåt nytt by Håkan Hellström.
In 2006 Johan Forsman engineered and remixed songs for the compilation album A Present from the Past by the Soundtrack of our lives.
In 2007 Forsman mixed Swedish grammy awarded album Night Falls Over Kortedala by Jens Lekman.
In 2008 Johan mixed and edited engineered on the album Communion by the Soundtrack of Our Lives.

References

 Sveriges Radio. Tracks
 Nyheter Johan Forsman kliver ut ur studion
 Johan Forsman
 Grammis Galan
 Behind the Music
 Behind the Music
 [ Billboard charts]
 Artist Direct. Albums
 35 år med Träd, Gräs och Stenar
 Psychedelic Fanzine
 Album credits
 Production credits

Sources
Tapefly The Lifting Of The Veil
Tapefly The Lifting Of The Veil
Expressen 
Gaffa. Recension
Sample albums. Tapefly The Lifting Of The Veil
Tapefly Lugn och fin
Tapefly Trädgårn Gbg 31 mars
Expressen 

Johan Forsman. History
Spelningarna uppdaterade
Marrakesh the band
Fair field. Live från studion

1968 births
Living people

Swedish male singers
Swedish record producers
Swedish guitarists
Male guitarists
Swedish male singer-songwriters
Swedish singer-songwriters
People from Gothenburg